Püstəqasım (also, Pyustakasym and Pyuztakasym) is a village and municipality in the Quba Rayon of Azerbaijan.  It has a population of 1,841.  The municipality consists of the villages of Püstəqasım, Güneyməhlə, and Dəhnə.

References

External links

Populated places in Quba District (Azerbaijan)